Rostislav Václavíček (7 December 1946 – 7 August 2022) was a Czech footballer who played as a defender. He was a participant in the 1980 Olympic Games, where Czechoslovakia won the gold medal.

In his country he played for FC Zbrojovka Brno, scoring 13 league goals in 289 games. He still holds the Czechoslovak and Czech league record playing 280 league matches in row.

References

External links
 

1946 births
2022 deaths
Sportspeople from Prostějov
Czech footballers
Czechoslovak footballers
Association football defenders
Footballers at the 1980 Summer Olympics
Olympic footballers of Czechoslovakia
Olympic gold medalists for Czechoslovakia
FC Zbrojovka Brno players
Olympic medalists in football
Medalists at the 1980 Summer Olympics
1. SK Prostějov players